is a railway station on the Hisatsu Line in Kirishima, Kagoshima, Japan, operated by Kyushu Railway Company (JR Kyushu). The station opened in 1958.

Lines
Nakafukura Station is served by the Hisatsu Line.

Layout
The station has a single side platform serving one bi-directional track.

Surrounding area
Kagoshima Prefectural Road Route 477
Kirishima City Nakafukura Elementary School
Nakafukura Community Center

See also
 List of railway stations in Japan

External links

  

Railway stations in Japan opened in 1958
Railway stations in Kagoshima Prefecture